Paul Anthony Johnson (born 19 September 1955) is an English former footballer who played in the Football League for Chester and Stoke City. During his time at Stoke he is referenced by his full name to avoid confusion with another Paul Johnson who was at Stoke at the same time.

Career
Johnson was born in Stoke-on-Trent and began his career with local side Stoke City progressing to the first team in 1976. At the same time another youth team player of the same name started to break into the first team. Johnson was the more successful of the two playing in 60 matches for Stoke before joining Chester in 1982. In the summer of 1978, Johnson was loaned to the second division American Soccer League side Southern California Lazers, for whom he made 24 appearances before returning to Stoke. He went on to play for non-league Altrincham.

Career statistics

References

English footballers
Stoke City F.C. players
Chester City F.C. players
English Football League players
1955 births
Living people
Altrincham F.C. players
Association football midfielders